This article gives a list of the episodes for the Disney children's television series My Friends Tigger & Pooh. Three seasons have been produced. They are shown worldwide, including on Playhouse Disney.

Series overview
{| class="wikitable"
! style="padding: 0px 8px" rowspan="2" colspan="2" | Season
! style="padding: 0px 8px" rowspan="2" | Episodes
! style="padding: 0px 80px" colspan="2" | Originally aired
|-
! First aired
! Last aired
|-
| style="background:orange; color: #100; text-align: center; top" |
| style="text-align: center; top" | [[List of My Friends Tigger & Pooh episodes#Season 1 (2007–08)|1]]
| style="text-align: center; top" | 26
| style="text-align: center; top" | May 12, 2007
| style="text-align: center; top" | August 16, 2008
|-
| style="background:purple; color: #100; text-align: center; top" |
| style="text-align: center; top" | [[List of My Friends Tigger & Pooh episodes#Season 2 (2008–09)|2]]
| style="text-align: center; top" | 19
| style="text-align: center; top" | September 27, 2008
| style="text-align: center; top" | July 12, 2009
|-
| style="background:green; color: #100; text-align: center; top" |
| style="text-align: center; top" | [[List of My Friends Tigger & Pooh episodes#Season 3 (2009–10)|3]]
| style="text-align: center; top" | 18
| style="text-align: center; top" | September 8, 2009
| style="text-align: center; top" | October 9, 2010
|-
| style="background:blue; color: #100; text-align: center; top" |
| style="text-align: center; top" | [[List of My Friends Tigger & Pooh episodes#Films|Films]]
| style="text-align: center; top" | 3 films
| style="text-align: center; top" | December 6, 2008
| style="text-align: center; top" | April 10, 2010
|}

Episodes

Season 1 (2007–08)
The airdates provided are the North American airdates, some of the episode had aired earlier outside the United States before being aired in there ("Darby's Tooth and Nothin' But the Tooth" / "Snow Problem Roo" being a prime example, having aired on Playhouse Disney Europe and Playhouse Disney Asia in October 2007, almost two months prior to its North American premiere).

Season 2 (2008–09)
The actual theme song is not changed, however Chloë Grace Moretz as the Darby character replaced Kay Hanley singing the theme, and a few animation pieces in the song is changed because of this, as well as a new song played occasionally called "The Question Song". The new version of the theme song and opening credits have been retroactively added to the repeats of Season 1 episodes, although the wording of old song was not replaced in the program's closed-captioning track. However "The Question Song" sung by Chloë Grace Moretz replaces the thinking song in most of season 2's episodes. One of the episodes was broadcast in the UK before broadcast in the United States.

Season 3 (2009–10)

Films

References

My Friends Tigger & Pooh